Jive Time is a pinball machine released on April 23, 1970 and made by the Williams Manufacturing Company. This table is nearly exactly the same as a pinball machine called Rock 'n Roll which was released on the same day as Jive Time. The only differences are that Jive Time has a replay feature and Rock 'n Roll has an Add a Ball feature. The designer of the two tables is Norm Clark and the art of the two tables was made by Christian Marche.

Gameplay
In Jive Time the main goal of the game is to get the ball into one of the Spin Holes. On the backglass there is an arrow that spins around a table of prizes each time a ball goes into the Spin Hole. Whatever prize the arrow stops on the player is rewarded with that prize.

Video games
Jive Time is a playable table in the Wii, PlayStation 3, PlayStation Portable, and the Xbox 360 versions of Pinball Hall of Fame: The Williams Collection. In that game, Jive Time is also the oldest of the tables. After Sorcerer was added to Pinball Hall of Fames successor The Pinball Arcade in February 2018, Jive Time is now the only table from The Williams Collection that is yet to be added to that game, and will remain so after the expiration of that game's Williams license on July 1, 2018.

External links
 
 

1970 pinball machines
Williams pinball machines